Alan Voskuil (born 10 September 1986) is a Danish-American professional basketball player for Treviglio of the Italian Serie A2 Basket. Since 2007, Voskuil plays for the Danish national basketball team.

Professional career
On 22 August 2015, Voskuil signed with Virtus Roma of the Italian Serie A2, the second division.

References

External links
Profile at Eurobasket.com
Texas Tech bio

1986 births
Living people
American expatriate basketball people in Canada
American expatriate basketball people in Denmark
American expatriate basketball people in France
American expatriate basketball people in Italy
American expatriate basketball people in Spain
American expatriate basketball people in Turkey
American men's basketball players
Baloncesto Fuenlabrada players
Basketball players from Alabama
Bornova Belediye players
Chorale Roanne Basket players
Danish men's basketball players
Eskişehir Basket players
Liga ACB players
Pallacanestro Biella players
Shooting guards
Sportspeople from Mobile, Alabama
Texas Tech Red Raiders basketball players
Viola Reggio Calabria players